Thomas Taylor (31 January 1851 – 17 December 1916) was a British Liberal Party politician.

Taylor was born in Bolton, the son of a corn merchant and was educated at the Bolton Church Institute. He was apprenticed at the age of 15 years to a firm of cotton manufacturers—the staple industry of Bolton at that time.  He worked his way up through the ranks to become manager of the Albert, then of the Cobden Mill and later joined the Board of the company. In 1894 he resigned and set up his own company at the Saville Mill. He was appointed a Justice of the Peace in Bolton in 1906 and was a member of the local Schools Board, as well as being an Examiner for Cotton Weaving for the City and Guilds in London.

Taylor was elected as Member of Parliament for Bolton at a by-election in 1912, but resigned in 1916 and died later that year aged 65. He is buried in St Peter's churchyard, Halliwell, Bolton. He had married Mary Ellen Lomax in 1874 and with her had two daughters and a son, Herbert, who was later elected as a local councillor.

References

External links 
 

1851 births
1916 deaths
People from Bolton
Liberal Party (UK) MPs for English constituencies
UK MPs 1910–1918
Burials in the Metropolitan Borough of Bolton